Vengalil Krishna Kumar Chatterjee  is a Professor of Endocrinology in the Department of Medicine at the University of Cambridge and a Fellow of Churchill College, Cambridge. He is also the director of the Cambridge Clinical Research Centre which is part of the National Institute for Health Research (NIHR).

Education
Chatterjee was educated at Wolfson College, Oxford where he was awarded Bachelor of Arts and Bachelor of Medicine, Bachelor of Surgery degrees in 1982.

Research and career
Chatterjee is distinguished for his discoveries of genetic disorders of thyroid gland formation, regulation of hormone synthesis and hormone action, which have advanced fundamental knowledge of the hypothalamic–pituitary–thyroid axis. He has identified dominant negative inhibition by defective nuclear receptors as a common mechanism in thyroid hormone resistance and peroxisome proliferator-activated receptor gamma (PPARγ)-mediated insulin resistance. He has shown how deficiency of human selenocysteine-containing proteins causes a multisystem disease, including disordered thyroid hormone metabolism. He seeks to translate such understanding into better diagnosis and therapy of both rare and common thyroid conditions.

Notable Cambridge scientists with whom Chatterjee has shared paper authorship include Sadaf Farooqi, Stephen O'Rahilly, Antonio Vidal-Puig, and  Nick Wareham.

Chatterjee was appointed Commander of the Order of the British Empire (CBE) in the 2023 New Year Honours for services to people with endocrine disorders.

References

Fellows of the Royal Society
Fellows of the Academy of Medical Sciences (United Kingdom)
Fellows of Churchill College, Cambridge
NIHR Senior Investigators
Alumni of the University of Oxford
Living people
1958 births
British endocrinologists
Commanders of the Order of the British Empire